Paksat-1, (Other former designation as Palapa-C1, HGS-3 and Anatolia-1), was a geosynchronous and communications satellite built and owned by the Boeing Company, leased to the Space & Upper Atmosphere Research Commission (SUPARCO) and renamed Paksat-1. It was successfully put on orbit on 1 February 1996 as Palapa-C1 for Indonesia as its original customer. But, after the technical problems, the satellite was leased to SUPARCO at an orbital location of 38° East longitude in December 2002. Paksat-1 offers the C-band and Ku-band coverage in over 75 countries across Europe, Africa, Middle East, South and Central Asia. Its customers included government organizations, television broadcasters, telecommunications companies, data and broadband internet service providers.

History

Palapa-C1
PT Satelit Palapa Indonesia (SATELINDO) chose Hughes in April 1993. It was built by Hughes Space and Communications Company for Indonesian telecommunications provider PT Satelit Palapa Indonesia (SATELINDO). It was based on the HS-601 satellite bus. Construction was done at El Segundo, California. Hughes also augmented the new master control station at Daan Mogot City near Jakarta. It had 30 C-band transponders and 4 Ku-band transponders. It was due to be located in geosynchronous orbit at 113° East above the equator.

Launch
Palapa-C1 was launched by a Atlas IIAS launch vehicle on 1 February 1996 at 01:15:01 UTC. The satellites were launched from Cape Canaveral in Florida. The liquid apogee engine of the satellite then raises it to geostationary orbit.

Later Indonesia declared the satellite unusable after an electric power anomaly. The insurance claims were paid and the title was transferred to Hughes Space and Communications Company, and renamed HGS-3, and was then acquired by Pakistan from Hughes Global Services on "Full Time Leasing" and relocated to Pakistan's reserved orbital position at 38° East.

HGS-3
Hughes Global Services purchased the satellite and renamed HGS-3.

Anatolia-1
The satellite was renamed Anatolia-1.

Paksat-1
Pakistan's government approved the acquisition on 3 July 2002 and the leasing with Hughes Global Services was agreed on 6 August 2002. The satellite started moving to its new orbital position on 5 December 2002  and it went through a name change from Anatolia-1 to Paksat-1 on 18 December 2002. After a series of orbital maneuvers, the satellite was stabilized at its final location on 20 December 2002 with 0° inclination. The satellite is in position at the Pakistani-licensed orbital location, 38° East longitude. The satellite was acquired for a cost of around five million dollars.

Mission 
The services include satellite communications in both C-band and Ku-band to customers in Pakistan, Africa and the Middle East. Paksat-1's 30 C-band transponders and 4 Ku-band transponders provide total range of satellite communication capabilities.

Payload characteristics 
30 C-band transponders and 4 Ku-band transponders provide the total range of satellite communications capabilities. The satellite is in a geostationary orbit at 38° East Longitude, and carries high power payloads in both bands.

Payload characteristics of PAKSAT-1 are as below:

Applications 
 Internet backbone extension
 Point-to-point data services
 Remote Internet access
 Broadcast services (video and data)
 Business VSAT networks
 Direct-to-home
 Thin route telephony support
 Shipboard communications

Channels 

 Geo Tv Network
 ARY Zauq
 ZINDAGI News
 Business Plus
 Channel 5
 City 42
 Dharti TV
 GNN
 Dhoom TV
 Din News
 filmWORLD
 G Kaboom
 Hadi TV
 Haq TV
 Indus News
 Indus Vision
 Kook TV
 Labbaik TV
 Madani Channel
 Mashal TV
 Mehran TV
 Metro One
 MTV Pakistan
 N-Vibe
 Nick Pakistan
 Oxygen
 Oye
 Play
 PTV Bolan
 Punjab TV
 Ravi TV
 Sabzbaat Balochistan TV
 Sahar 2
 Sindh TV
 Sindh TV News
 Sohni Dharti
 Star Asia
 Value TV
 VSH News
 VTV 1 (Virtual University)
 VTV 2 (Virtual University)
 VTV 3 (Virtual University)
 VTV 4 (Virtual University)
 Zaiqa
 ptv sports
 Feed1
 Ptv Global
 Ptv World

Paksat footprints 
Paksat-1 has two beams each in both C-band and Ku-bands, i.e. C1, C2 and K1, K2, respectively. In C-band, C1 (Southern Beam) covers mainly African Continent and Middle East. The C2 (Northern Beam) covers South Asia, Middle East, African Continent, Central Asian States and Southern Europe. In Ku-band, K1 (Southern Beam) covers mainly Middle East and Eastern Africa. K2 (Northern Beam) covers South Asia, Middle East and Central Asian States.

Future projects 
Telesat, one of the world's leading satellite operators, announced on 13 March 2007, that it had signed a consulting contract with the Space and Upper Atmosphere Research Commission (SUPARCO), Pakistan's national space agency. Under the agreement, Telesat will assist SUPARCO in the procurement and launch of the Paksat-1R satellite, which will replace the existing Paksat-1 in 2010.

References

External links 
 Paksat Project
 Paksat-1 payload characteristics
 Channel guide
 SUPARCO: Paksat-1
 Palapa-C1, -C2 / HGS-3 / Anatolia-1 History of Paksat-1 before it was acquired by Pakistan

Spacecraft launched in 1996
Communications satellites in geostationary orbit
SUPARCO satellites
History of science and technology in Pakistan
Communications satellites of Pakistan